Thomas Jeffrey Plewes (born December 15, 1940) is a retired lieutenant general in the United States Army. He is a former chief of the United States Army Reserve, a position he held from May 25, 1998 to May 24, 2002.

Raised in Zeeland, Michigan, Plewes earned a B.A. degree in economics from Hope College in 1962. He went to work for the United States Department of Labor as an economist in Washington, D.C. After Project Head Start was launched in 1965, Plewes was sent to help establish local programs for poor and minority preschoolers in the South. Near the end of 1965, he lost his Selective Service occupational deferment. Plewes enlisted in the Army in 1966 and was commissioned on January 20, 1967 after completing Engineer Officer Candidate School.

Plewes served on active duty until February 1969, which included time spent in West Germany. He then joined the Bureau of Labor Statistics at the Department of Labor, but remained a Reserve officer. Plewes completed an M.A. degree in economics at George Washington University in 1972. He became deputy commanding general of the United States Army Reserve Command in December 1996 and then became commanding general in May 1998. Plewes was promoted to lieutenant general in June 2001.

Plewes was named a Fellow of the American Statistical Association in 1989.

References

1940 births
Living people
People from Zeeland, Michigan
Hope College alumni
American economists
United States Department of Labor officials
George Washington University alumni
Recipients of the Meritorious Service Medal (United States)
Recipients of the Legion of Merit
United States Army generals
Recipients of the Distinguished Service Medal (US Army)
Fellows of the American Statistical Association